Route 76 may refer to:

London Buses route 76

See also
List of highways numbered 76

76